Hymenaea stiginocarpa is an irregularly shaped, mostly  high tree that has been assigned to the pea family. It has a twisted spindle-shaped trunk, a very rough grey bark, and reddish-brown twigs. The deciduous leaves consist of two large asymmetrical leaflets with an entire margin. The flowers occur in clusters of up to thirty at the end of the branches. It produces edible, highly appreciated fruits, which are often collected from the wild and used by local people. The vernacular name of this species in Brazil is jatobá do cerrado.

Taxonomy 
Friedrich Gottlob Hayne, a German botanist, first scientifically described this species in 1830 as Hymenaea stigonocarpa, a name that had been used before by Carl Friedrich Philipp von Martius, and was based on a specimen collected from a seasonally dry forest type, locally known as Caatinga, in the state of Piauí, north-eastern Brazil, during his 1817-1820 expedition. In 1870 however, George Bentham applied the name to specimens collected in the Cerrado of Central Brazil, and the name has since been used in association with specimens from the Cerrado. In addition he created the subspecies pubescens. João Barbosa Rodrigues, one of the most famous Brazilian botanists,  in 1898 distinguished H. chapadensis, as well as H. correana, both of which were later considered synonyms of H. stigononcarpa subsp. pubescens. In 1925, Adolpho Ducke assigned the name Hymenaea velutina to specimens collected in north-eastern Brazil, which also became widely used for specimens from Caatinga. Recently, it has been established that the original material used to describe H. stigonocarpa belongs to the same species as the type of H. velutina. It has now been proposed to conserve the name H. velutina over H. stigonocarpa Hayne, and to continue applying H. stigonocarpa to the species from the Cerrado as used by Bentham.

Description 
Hymenaea stigonocarpa has twenty four chromosomes (2n=24). It has a twisted trunk covered by a thick rough grey bark and reddish-brown twigs. The flowers of this species are the largest in the genus, and the petals are somewhat larger than the sepals. The five sepals are thick and are deflected when the flowers have opened. Up to thirty flowers are set in inflorescences at the tip of the branches, subtended by bracts. The species depends on cross-pollination and is pollinated mainly by bats. Self-fertilised flowers are aborted after a week. The mesocarp and endocarp have been transformed into yellowish, soft, fibrous, slightly sweet flour-rich pulp with a characteristic smell. A prominent suture line surrounds the entire legume. Fruits are ripe between April and July in the Federal District, July to November in Mato Grosso do Sul and August in Minas Gerais. It contains one to six seeds. Overly ripe fruits emit an unpleasant smell.

Ecology 
The nectar-rich flowers of Hymenaea stiginocarpa open at night and are pollinated by several bat species, among which are the mostly fruit-eating Platyrhinus lineatus and Carollia perspicilata and the nectar specialist Glossophaga soricina. Hawkmoths also frequent the flowers, but seem ineffective in pollinating them. Self-pollinated seeds do not fully mature. Although the flower’s own pollen grains grow tubes and fertilise ovules as successfully as pollen from a different specimen, after seven or eight days the self-pollinated fruits fall from the tree. The mechanism to abort self-pollinated fruits is not known, but cross-fertilised ovules grow faster from the start.
By producing annually large amounts of fruits that are consumed by terrestrial fauna, the species also plays an important ecological role. It has been suggested that the agouti is responsible for most of the seed dispersal of H. stigonocarpa.

Unlike many other species of the family Fabaceae, Hymenaea stiginocarpa is said to lack  symbiontic soil bacteria, and therefore is unable to directly use the nitrate made by the bacteria from atmospheric nitrogen.

Distribution  
Hymenaea stiginocarpa occurs in northern, central, and eastern Brazil and in Paraguay.

Uses 
Jatobá do cerrado is an important tree for the people of the Brazilian Cerrado, and it represents a substantial economic value with its high quality wood, resin and edible fruits. These fruits can be used to produce flour and in the preparation of different types of food. With the increasing demand for the  products of this plant, there is a need for commercial cultivation and for growing high quality seedlings.

Jatobá fruit pulp contains about 5½% protein, and almost 50% high-fibre flour consisting of 40% non-soluble fibre and about 9% soluble fibre.

Basic nutritional components, vitamins and minerals of Jatobá do cerrado fruit pulp

The flour made from jatobá is appreciated by the local people in the Cerrado and used to prepare jelly, liqueur, cakes, breads and porridge. The resin from the stems of jatobá do cerrado is used to polish canoes, and to produce varnishes.

Scholars showed a large variation in genetics between and within subpopulations that corresponds to variability in the weight of the fruit, and this provides perspective for breeding varieties with more favourable traits for human use. Seedlings can be grown in plastic bags with 50% shading, and do best in a mineral soil without organic compost and in a greenhouse. H. stigonocarpa grows best in a sunny spot and prefers well-drained soil. When established, the trees are somewhat resistant to drought. In general, it grows slowly. Jatobá do cerrado is sometimes planted as an ornamental.

One study showed that extracts of H. stigonocarpa suppressed cell division in onions, and this may imply that it contains some cytotoxic substance.

References 

stigonocarpa
Trees of Brazil
Plants described in 1830